Colonel E. D. F. Prah is a former Chief of Defence Staff of the Ghana Armed Forces. This was after the Armed Forces Revolutionary Council overthrew the Supreme Military Council led by Lt. General Fred Akuffo in June 1979. He was replaced in July 1979 by Brigadier Joshua Nunoo-Mensah.

After retiring from the Ghana Armed Forces, he served as executive director of the Veterans Association of Ghana.

References

Living people
Ghanaian soldiers
Ghanaian military personnel
Year of birth missing (living people)